The Ibran ( or Cimraan, Full Name: Muhammad ('cimran) ibn ash-Shaykh Isḥāq ibn Aḥmad) is a major clan of the wider Isaaq clan family. Ibran had two sons, Egale And Yonis. Yonis's son Mohamed have two sons Abdalle, and Essa. Its members form part of the larger Habr Je'lo confederation along with the Muse Sheikh Ishaaq, Sanbuur and Tol Je'lo clans. Politically however, the Ibran are part of the Habr Je'lo.

The clan primarily inhabits the Togdheer region of Somaliland, ( war imran district is their largest city ) as well as the Somali Region in Ethiopia.

History 

Sheikh Ishaaq ibn Ahmed was one of the Arabian scholars that crossed the sea from Arabia to the Horn of Africa to spread Islam around 12th to 13th century. He is said to have been descended from Prophet Mohammed's daughter Fatimah. Hence the Sheikh belonged to the Ashraf or Sada, titles given to the descendants of the prophet. He married two local women in Somaliland that left him eight sons, one of them being Muhammad (Imran). The descendants of those eight sons constitute the Isaaq clan-family.

Distribution 
The Ibran primarily reside in Togdheer region  in Somaliland, as well as the Somali Region in Ethiopia. They also have a large settlement in Kenya where they are known as a constituent segment of the Isahakia community.

Notable figures 
 Bashe Awil Omar - former Deputy Foreign Minister of Somaliland as well as former Somaliland ambassador to Kenya and the UAE
 Ibrahim Ismail sugulle ( sooraan) - was a famous poet,  comedian and composer. 
 Aqil yare- was the clan's chief and famous elder during colonial era. 
 General burale muhumed willad - brigadier general of Somalia. 
 Hassan mo'allim - former presidential minister. 
 Jama Abdillahi biin - former governor of togdheer region and state minister. 
 Mohamed nafaqo , the incumbent governor of the togdheer region. 
 Guled Mohamed warsame - member of SOMALILAND parliament. 
 General jama madaxyar - was somaliland's chief of intelligence agency. 
 Shiine falliidh - the deputy leader of mideeye political party 
 General Ismael Ali farah- the eastern military court leader 
 Abdinassir omer : deputy minister of MOFA.
 Yusuf Osman Abdulle ( shacir) a well known poet and socialist.

References 

Somali clans
Somali clans in Ethiopia